Perkinsidae is a family of alveolates in the phylum Perkinsozoa, a sister group to the dinoflagellates.

Members
It includes Perkinsus species, which are parasitic protozoans, some of which cause disease and mass mortality in wild and farmed molluscs such as oysters.

There are two genera: 
Parvilucifera, a genus of 3 species
Perkinsus, a genus of 7 to 8 species

Characteristics
Perkinsidae possess plastids which do not contain DNA.

References

Perkinsozoa
Alveolata families